Oscar Poey Bonachea was one of the pioneers of Cuban Scouting.

Background
The first troops of Boy Scouts in Cuba met under the sponsorship of the American Legion, the Mother's Club del Vedado and the electric generating plant of the Compañía Cubana de Electricidad. Angel Loustalot, the son of Jules Loustalot, was commissioner for other pioneers of the Scout Movement, Enrique Quintana, Dr. Moisés Boudé, Domingo Romeo Jaime and Oscar Poey Bonachea.

References

External links
The Political Testament of Miguel Angel Quevedo
El mea culpa de Miguel Ángel Quevedo, antes de suicidarse
Escultismo en Cuba
Este sitio es mantenido y editado por V. Iván López Pedreguera, ex Jefe de Scouts en Cuba, Grupo # 1 de Onicajinal, Güines, Prov. de la Habana.
El Escultismo cubano on Vimeo

Scouting pioneers
Scouting and Guiding in Cuba
Year of birth missing